Edward Godfrey Cox (1876–1963) was an American linguist and yachtsman.  He was born in Ottawa, Ohio and became a professor at Cornell University and then University of Washington. He was the editor of the journal Modern Language Quarterly from 1943 to 1963, when he died.

References

Linguists from the United States
American male sailors (sport)
1876 births
1963 deaths
University of Washington faculty
Cornell University faculty
People from Ottawa, Ohio